The Syracuse University College of Professional Studies, formerly known as University College, is the continuing education school of Syracuse University in Syracuse, New York. Founded in 1918, the school offers over one hundred bachelor's and master's degrees and certificates in flexible formats, including online, accelerated, evening, and hybrid classes, primarily catered to part-time students. Syracuse University was one of the first universities in the U.S. open to nontraditional, part-time adult students.

History  
The school traces its roots to 1902 when Syracuse University began offering summer courses to part-time students. In 1918, the Evening Session program was officially launched to increase access to higher education and allow nontraditional students and working people to gain the education needed to excel in conditions created by World War I. All courses were held after 7:30 p.m. and tuition was only $5 per credit at the time.

As enrollment and academic offerings increased, it was renamed to the School of Extension Teaching and Adult Education in 1930. It was renamed again to University College in 1946 to reflect its equal status with other SU colleges and schools.

The school was housed in Peck Hall, the home of SU's former College of Medicine, from 1947 until 1957 when it relocated to Reid Hall. Since 1998, the school has been located at 700 University Ave. across from the Whitman School of Management.

In 2021, the school became the College of Professional Studies.

Academics 
The school offers over one hundred undergraduate degree programs that can be completed through on campus part-time study in collaboration with other SU colleges and schools. It offers online Bachelor of Professional Studies (BPS) in several disciplines, such as business management, computer programming, healthcare administration, and policy studies, and a Master of Professional Studies (MPS) in project management.

The Summer College program is offered to high school students aged 15 or older, which provides prospective students an opportunity to take a college-level course, live in a residence hall, and experience life at college.

References

External links
 
 

Professional
1918 establishments in New York (state)
Educational institutions established in 1918